Lucy Rowan Mann (June 20, 1921 – January 16, 2022) was an American nonprofit administrator. She was the executive director of the Walter W. Naumburg Foundation.

References

1921 births
2022 deaths
20th-century American women
21st-century American women
American centenarians
Women centenarians